Laleh Marzban (born January 19, 1994) is an Iranian actress. She is best known for her roles in Under the Smoky Roof (2017), New Moon Hotel (2019) and Majority (2021). Marzban earned a Crystal Simorgh nomination for her performance in The Night Guardian (2022).

Career
Marzban made her debut in 2010 with the television series Black Intelligence. She demonstrated her talent with her performance in the movie Under the Smokey Roof (2017). 

Among the movies in which she has performed are Hush! Girls Don't Scream (2013), Under the Smokey Roof (2017), Damascus Time (2018) and New Moon Hotel (2019).

Some of the series in which she has appeared are Setayesh 3 (2019), Anam (2018) and Black Intelligence (2010).

Filmography

Film

Television

Awards and nominations

See also 
 Iranian women
 Iranian cinema
 Fajr International Film Festival

References

External links
 Laleh Marzban on IMDb
 Laleh Marzban on Instagram
 Laleh Marzban on Filcin Website

1994 births
Living people
People from Tehran
Iranian film actresses
Iranian television actresses